Super Mario 3D may refer to the following video games:

Super Mario 3D All-Stars
Super Mario 3D Land
Super Mario 3D World